Michael Cook (born 9 April 1951) is an English former professional footballer who played as a right back. Cook spent his entire career with Colchester United, making 614 appearances in the Football League and holds the all-time club record for appearances. During his career he was part of the side which won the Watney Cup and that beat Leeds United in the FA Cup. After retiring he became a youth coach at Colchester as well as having a brief spell as caretaker manager in 1999. His time at the club was ended in 2004 when he was made redundant by the club. During his time as a youth coach he helped talents such as Lomana Tresor Lua Lua to develop.

References

External links

1951 births
Living people
English footballers
Association football defenders
Leyton Orient F.C. players
Colchester United F.C. players
English Football League players
Colchester United F.C. managers
English football managers
Association football coaches